A Gaelic Blessing is an English language choral composition by John Rutter, consisting of four vocal parts (SATB) and organ or orchestra. It is also known by the repeating first line of the text, "Deep peace". The work was commissioned by the Chancel Choir of First United Methodist Church, Omaha, Nebraska, for their conductor Mel Olson. It was published first in 1978 by Hinshaw Music, by Oxford University Press and by the Royal School of Church Music.

History, text and music 
The piece was commissioned by the Chancel Choir of First United Methodist Church in Omaha, Nebraska, for their conductor Mel Olson in 1978. Rutter, an Anglican,  set many biblical texts for Christian services.

The format of the text is based in a similar format to that found in some Celtic Christian prayers and songs, such as those found in the Christian-era Scottish Gaelic collection, the Carmina Gadelica. Rutter has said that his English-only composition is based on "an old Gaelic rune", and that he added a line mentioning Jesus and the word Amen, to make it also a Christian anthem. However, most surviving prayers with this structure, in both Gaelic and English, already include Christian elements. The original, English-language piece that the central lines of Rutter's piece are directly excerpted from, published in the 1895 novel, The Dominion of Dreams: Under the Dark Star, by Celtic Revival writer William Sharp / Fiona Macleod, while not containing the words "Jesus," or "Amen," does mention both "the Son of Peace" and "the heart of Mary," along with other Christian imagery.

Both Sharp's and Rutter's compositions begin every line with "deep peace", and refer in a repetitive manner to the elements of nature, such as, "running wave", "flowing air", "quiet earth", "shining stars", "gentle night", "healing light", and (in Rutter's version) to "Christ, light of the world".  The almost-identical nature of the two pieces, along with Rutter's comments on his additions, mark Sharp's 1895 English-language composition as the original.

Rutter scored the piece for four vocal parts (SATB) and organ, or orchestra. Marked "Flowing and tranquil", the music is in E major and 3/4 time. The organ accompaniment rests on a pattern of chords held often for a full measure in the left hand, and broken chords in eighth-notes in the right hand. The choir voices enter together, with the lower voices also moving slowly like the left hand (a full measure for "Deep", another one for "peace"), while the soprano pronounces "peace" sooner and moves up in eighth-notes on "running wave". The pattern is kept for most of the piece. Dynamically, the music begins softly (p), growing slightly (to mp) for the "shining stars", and again later for "moon and stars". A climax is "Christ", marked crescendo to a strong (f) "light of the world" (with all voices holding the word "light" for more than a measure), but diminuendo to a very soft ending, with all voices and the accompaniment calming to slow movement.

Performances and recordings 
The composition is characterized as slow-paced and of a gentle nature. It was published first in 1987 by Hinshaw Music, but then, like other music by John Rutter, by Oxford University Press (also in versions with harp or with string orchestra) and by the Royal School of Church Music. It has been recorded in collections of Rutter's choral works performed under his direction by the Cambridge Singers and the City of London Sinfonia. Together with the composer's Requiem, it was recorded in 2010 by the choir Polyphony and the Bournemouth Sinfonietta, conducted by Stephen Layton.

References

External links 
 A Gaelic blessing worldcat.org
 Deep peace of the running wave to you. text on lyricsera.com
 Rutter: A Gaelic Blessing (SATB) (Sheet Music) prestoclassical.co.uk
 John Rutter / Requiem Hyperion 1997
  John Rutter / Director singers.com

Choral compositions
Compositions by John Rutter
1978 compositions